{{DISPLAYTITLE:C7H12O2}}
The molecular formula C7H12O2 may refer to:

 Butyl acrylate
 Cyclohexanecarboxylic acid
 trans-3-Methyl-2-hexenoic acid (TMHA)

Molecular formulas